Bør Børson II is a 1976 Norwegian musical film directed by Stein-Roger Bull and starring Rolv Wesenlund and Britt Langlie. The film is a sequel to the 1974 film Bør Børson Jr.

External links
 
 

1976 films
1970s musical films
Norwegian musical films